The MAK Center for Art and Architecture is an art museum and cultural center headquartered in the Schindler House in West Hollywood, California, United States. It is affiliated with the Museum of Applied Arts, Vienna (MAK). The Center is situated in three significant architectural landmarks by Austrian-American architect R.M. Schindler. The center operates a residency program and exhibition space at the Mackey Apartments and runs residencies and a study center at the Fitzpatrick-Leland House.

History 
Founded in 1994 by Peter Noever through a cooperative agreement between the Friends of Schindler House and MAK, the museum has transformed the mandate of historic houses to include contemporary art and architecture program. 

On August 10, 1994, the Friends of the Schindler House signed an agreement with the Austrian Museum of Applied Arts in Vienna (Museum für angewandte Kunst Wien) to create the nonprofit MAK Center for Art and Architecture.

Exhibitions and Programs 
Major exhibitions in the Center’s history include: Schindler Houses: 100 Years in the Making (2022), an exhibition celebrating the first century of the modernist house; AMEND (2020), an exhibition and series of four performances by multi-disciplinary artist Chris Emile that explores Black male identity through movement, cinema, sculpture and sound; Soft Schindler (2019) showed the incompleteness of binary ideas in architecture, sculpture, and design; How to Read El Pato Pascual: Disney's Latin America and Latin America's Disney (2017), curated by Jesse Lerner and Rubén Ortiz Torres, presented as part of the Getty's Pacific Standard Time: LA/LA and considering questions of cultural appropriation and exchange through Disney characters; Routine Pleasures (2016), curated by Michael Ned Holte, promoted the idea of the “termite tendency” in art production via the work of sixteen L.A.-based producers; A Vast Furniture by Carmen Argote expanded the site of the Schindler House by changing the terms in which to consider the house’s location and history; Tony Greene: Room of Advances (2014) sustained a three-month public dialogue about art and activism in the LGBTQ community; and Everything Loose Will Land (2013) curated by UCLA scholar Sylvia Lavin, explored the cross-pollination that took place between architects and artists in the region in the 1970s. 

Additional past exhibitions include: Anarchitecture: Works by Gordon Matta-Clark (1997); Martin Kippenberger: The Last Stop West—METRO–Net Projects (1998); Architecture and Revolution: The Cuban National Art Schools (1999); Richard Prince: Up State (2000); Frederick J. Kiesler: Endless Space (2000–01), Gerald Zugmann, “Blue Universe: Architectural Manifestos by COOP HIMMELB(L)AU” (2002), Skip Arnold, 835 North Kings Road (2003), Contemporary Architects Face Schindler Today (2003), Yves Klein: Air Architecture (2004); Amir Zaki: Spring Through Winter (2005); Gunther Domenig: Structures that Fit My Nature (2005); Issac Julien: True North (2005); Symmetry (2006); Repeat: Brandon Lattu (2006); The Gen(H)ome Project (2006); Arnulf Rainer: Hypergraphics (2007); Victor Burgin: The Little House (2007).

Residencies 
The MAK Center operates the international MAK Artists and Architects-in-Residence Program at the Mackey Apartments, a six-month residency offered twice annually to two artists and two architects per cycle.  Residents live and work in the Mackey Apartments, and present projects in exhibitions at the end of their term in March and September. The main focus of the residency is on the purposeful long-term support of individual early-career artists and architects, in order to create new interdisciplinary opportunities and confrontations through lively engagement. The program has been running continuously since October 1995. To date, the MAK Center has hosted 200 individual residents, activating a global dialogue between Los Angeles’ arts and cultural community and resident artists and architects from Austria, Argentina, Brazil, India, Mexico, Peru, Russia, South Africa, South Korea, Taiwan, Thailand, Turkey, amongst others. In order to expand the cultural exchange at the core of its residency program, the Center initiated a twice-yearly exhibition series, Garage Exchange, in 2012, which invites alumni residents to collaborate with L.A. artists and architects of their choosing.

Sites 
The MAK Center operates three works of architecture by Rudolph M. Schindler: the landmark Schindler House in West Hollywood, the Mackey Apartments in Mid-City Los Angeles, and the Fitzpatrick-Leland House in the Hollywood Hills.

The Schindler House (1922) serves as the headquarters of MAK Center for Art and Architecture, founded in 1994 as an independent satellite of the MAK – Austrian Museum of Applied Arts, Vienna, in cooperation with the Federal Chancellery of Austria/Art Division and the Friends of the Schindler House (FoSH).

The Mackey Apartments (1939) are the home to the MAK Center’s residency program designed for visiting artists, architects, and students of architecture. The building was purchased by the Republic of Austria in 1995 and made available for the activities of the MAK Center. Restoration work began in 1995 by the Central Office of Architecture, and continued with architects Space International in 2001 and 2004, thanks to funding by the Austrian Federal Ministry of Economic Affairs and Labor. The Mackey Apartments hosts the  Artists and Architects-in-Residence Program, a six-month residency hosted twice annually, and serves as a contemporary exhibition space for residents and international and local artists.

Leadership 
In 2002, architect and curator Kimberli Meyer was named director. In 2016, Meyer announced her departure from MAK Center to helm the Cal State Long Beach Art Museum. From 2016-2020, Priscilla Fraser, then Project Architect at LACMA, joined the MAK Center. In 2021, Jia Yi Gu, former director at Materials & Applications was named the museum's new  director.

References

External links

Art museums and galleries in California
Buildings and structures in West Hollywood, California